NGC 161 is a lenticular galaxy in the Cetus constellation. It was discovered on November 21, 1886, by Lewis A. Swift.

Notes

References

External links 
 
 SEDS

Astronomical objects discovered in 1886
002131
Cetus (constellation)
0161
Lenticular galaxies